Gulu Regional Cancer Centre (GRCC) is a planned public, specialized, tertiary care medical facility owned by the Uganda Ministry of Health, intended to provide care for cancer patients in the Northern Region of Uganda.

Location
Initially, the facility is expected to be stationed within Gulu Regional Referral Hospital, who will be responsible for its daily operations.

Later, a permanent building to house the cancer centre is expected to be constructed outside of the referral hospital. Initially, the space formerly occupied by Gulu Central Police Station was proposed. However in 2017, when Gulu District failed to secure enough land to accommodate a stand-alone facility, the request for land was forwarded to Omoro District, to the south of Gulu District. Omoro District authorities allocated  at the Koro sub-county headquarters for the purpose of housing the cancer centre.

Overview
GRCC is a cancer treatment, research, and teaching center, affiliated with the Gulu University School of Medicine and with the Gulu Regional Referral Hospital, the teaching hospital for the medical school. GRCC is expected to become functional in the financial year 2019/2020, which starts on 1 July 2019.

The establishment of the centre was informed by the increased patient burden at Uganda Cancer Institute, in Kampala, the country's capital city, where 4,500 to 6,000 new cancer patients are registered annually. As of May 2016, approximately 60,000 new cancer patients are diagnosed annually in Uganda. Of these, an estimated 47,000 (78.3 percent) cancer patients die of their disease within one year, partly due to "late diagnosis and inappropriate treatment".

Other regional cancer centers established in this effort include Arua Regional Cancer Centre, Mbarara Regional Cancer Centre and Mbale Regional Cancer Centre. In 2017, the government of Uganda borrowed €100 million (USh390 billion at that time), from the government of Austria to construct the four afore-mentioned cancer centres.

In November 2020, Matia Kasaija, Uganda's finance minister, signed documents, accepting an interest-free loan from the government of Austria and Unicredit Bank, amounting to €7.5 million (UGX:33 billion at the time), specifically intended to construct the new Gulu Regional Cancer Centre.

Collaboration
The cancer centre works in collaboration with Uganda Cancer Institute (UCI), the leading cancer treatment and research institute in Uganda, which is under transformation into the East African Cancer Centre of Excellence. UCI specialists work together with Gulu Regional Referral Hospital staff to provide the necessary oncology care.

See also
 Hospitals in Uganda

References

External links
Gulu's Only Cancer Treatment Centre Shuts Down As of 3 July 2012.
Uganda - Gulu Cancer Registry

Medical research institutes in Uganda
Gulu
2019 establishments in Uganda
Hospitals in Uganda
Cancer organisations based in Uganda